Elizabeth Louise Alice Connors (born 1960) is Associate Professor of History at the University of Southern Queensland.

In 1992, Connors co-wrote Australia's frontline : remembering the 1939-45 war with Lynette Finch, Kay Saunders and Helen Taylor.

In 1999, Connors published A history of the Australian environment movement with co-author Drew Hutton.

In 2015 Connors received the Queensland Premier's Award for a work of State Significance for Warrior: A Legendary Leader's Dramatic Life and Violent Death on the Colonial Frontier. The book followed Dalla lawman Dundalli from his life in southeast Queensland to his execution outside Brisbane gaol on 5 January 1855.

References

1960 births
Australian women historians
Living people
People from Brisbane
University of Queensland alumni
Academic staff of the University of Southern Queensland